Westside Park at Bellwood Quarry is a park in the City of Atlanta located on the site of the former Bellwood Quarry.  The park is between Johnson Road and Donald Lee Hollowell Parkway and between the neighborhoods of Bankhead, Grove Park, and Knight Park/Howell Station, of which a large portion of the park falls within the Grove Park boundaries. Westside Park at Bellwood Quarry was a major green space project of the Atlanta BeltLine master plan. The park has trail connectivity to the Proctor Creek Greenway Trail (Phase 1) and will ultimately have connectivity to the BeltLine.

Status
The land, which was owned by Fulton County, was previously leased to Vulcan Materials. On December 10, 2005, Atlanta Mayor Shirley Franklin announced a plan to acquire the lease and the land in order to create a  park with a  lake which would also serve as a drinking water reservoir. The plan was a portion of the extensive BeltLine project to construct a ring of parks, trails, and transit surrounding the core of Atlanta. As proposed, Westside Reservoir Park was nearly twice the size of Atlanta's premiere greenspace, Piedmont Park. Acquisition by the city was completed on June 30, 2006.

On December 29, 2017, outgoing mayor Kasim Reed unveiled plans for phase one of the park's construction. The cost of the first phase was approximately $26.5 million. Phase one includes a gateway to the park, a "grand overlook" of both the quarry and the Atlanta skyline, and pedestrian connections to the Proctor Creek Greenway.

On September 6, 2018, the official groundbreaking took place for Westside Reservoir Park.

On August 27, 2019, Westside Park at Bellwood Quarry received a major boost with the announcement that the Arthur M. Blank Family Foundation awarded a $17.5 million grant for the BeltLine project. The Blank grant accelerated the development of parks and trails along the 22-mile circular corridor – especially on the Westside.

At a ribbon cutting ceremony August 20, 2021, Atlanta's Westside Park was opened to the public.

Bellwood Quarry

The former granite quarry, which closed in 2007, was a popular hang-out spot for local teens. The site was used as a location for the filming of the AMC's series The Walking Dead in summer 2010. It was also used as a filming location in season four episode 14 of The Vampire Diaries, a scene in Mockingjay Part 1, as well as the final scene of The Fundamentals of Caring. Most recently, (2016) it serves a significant role and is featured prominently in several episodes of the highly acclaimed Netflix series Stranger Things.  During construction of the reservoir and the park, the area is closed to the public and trespassers will be arrested. A five-mile tunnel was dug to access water and the reservoir began filling in April 2020.

References

External links
 Bellwood Quarry/Westside Park - Trust for Public Land
 Show in Google Maps

Mines in Georgia (U.S. state)
Parks in Atlanta
2021 establishments in Georgia (U.S. state)
Parks established in 2021